Carrapateira is a municipality in the state of Paraíba in the Northeast Region of Brazil.

Etymology 
The word carrapateira comes from carrapa (half-beetle), because the indigenous tribes used it for eating, skinning and throwing it around. The fish oil extracted from carp is widely used in the food industry. Crabs are widely collected in the region. Fish is also a major source of food.

See also
List of municipalities in Paraíba

References

Municipalities in Paraíba